McKeesport is a city in Allegheny County, Pennsylvania, United States. It is situated at the confluence of the Monongahela and Youghiogheny rivers and within the Pittsburgh metropolitan area. The population was 17,727 as of the 2020 census.

History

Early history
David McKee emigrated from Scotland and was the first permanent white settler at the forks of the Monongahela and Youghiogheny Rivers, the site of present-day McKeesport, in 1755. Around the time of the French and Indian Wars, George Washington often came to McKeesport to visit his friend, Queen Alliquippa, a Seneca Indian ruler. The Colonial Government granted David McKee exclusive right of ferrage over those rivers on April 3, 1769, called "McKee's Port".

His son, John McKee, an original settler of Philadelphia, built a log cabin at this location. After taking over his father's local river ferry business, he devised a plan for a city to be called McKee's Port in 1795. John set out his proposal in the Pittsburgh Gazette, as part of a program under which new residents could purchase plots of land for $20.00. A lottery was used to distribute the plots to avoid complaints from new land owners concerning "inferior" locations.

19th century

McKeesport, then part of Versailles Township, began to grow in 1830 when mining of the large deposits of bituminous coal in the region began. The first schoolhouse was built in 1832, with James E. Huey as its schoolmaster.

McKeesport was incorporated as a borough in 1842, and the city's first steel mill was established in 1851. The National Tube Works opened in 1872, and in the years directly following, according to the U.S. Census Bureau, McKeesport was the fastest growing municipality in the nation. Families arrived from other parts of the eastern United States, Italy, Germany, Russia, Poland, Czechoslovakia, and Hungary, with most working at the National Tube Works.

20th century

McKeesport rose to national importance during the 1900s as a center for manufacturing steel.  In 1899, the National Tube Works Company was consolidated with twenty other pipemaking firms in the northeastern United States to form the National Tube Company. In 1901, the National Tube Company and nine other major American steel companies merged to form U.S. Steel.
The city's population continued to grow steadily, reaching a peak of 55,355 in 1940. The subsequent decline since then is attributable to the general economic malaise that descended upon the region when the steelmaking industry moved elsewhere.

On June 23, 1944, an F4 tornado struck the southern part of McKeesport, killing 17 people. Many multiple-story residences collapsed. In all, 88 homes in the city were destroyed, 306 were damaged, and 400 other buildings were damaged or destroyed.

Thirteen years before both faced off in some of the most memorable televised Presidential debates, future presidents (and contemporary U.S. Representatives) Richard M. Nixon and John F. Kennedy met in McKeesport for their first of five debates on April 22, 1947, to debate labor issues related to the Taft-Hartley Act.

On May 21, 1976, downtown McKeesport experienced the largest fire in the city's history, referred to as the "Famous Fire", due to the fire beginning in the "Famous Department Store" on Market and Fifth Streets. The fire destroyed seven downtown structures, heavily damaged more than 12 others, and started fires in at least 10 homes due to hot embers blowing more than a half mile due to heavy gusting winds. Around 1,000 firefighters from more than 40 neighboring fire companies responded to assist, and a contingent of the Pennsylvania Army National Guard were deployed. The McKeesport Daily News reported the next day that "only shells and piles of rubble" remained "where city landmarks once stood."

National Tube closed in the 1980s, along with other U.S. Steel plants in the Mon Valley. The city, with the help of regional development agencies, has conducted efforts to revitalize the former mill sites.

Geography

The city is on the Allegheny Plateau, within the ecoregion of the Western Allegheny Plateau. The downtown area is located to the northwest, while the southern and eastern areas of the city are primarily residential.

Climate
The climate in this area is characterized by hot, humid summers and generally mild to cool winters.  According to the Köppen Climate Classification system, McKeesport has a humid continental climate, abbreviated "Dfa" on climate maps.

Surrounding and adjacent communities
McKeesport has five land borders, including the Township of North Versailles to the north-northeast, the Borough of White Oak to the east, and Borough of Versailles to the south. The section of the city west of the Monongahela River and Youghiogheny River confluence is bordered by the Borough of Port Vue to the south and the Borough of Glassport to the southwest. The City of Duquesne is located north across the Monongahela River, connected by the McKeesport-Duquesne Bridge, as is Dravosburg and West Mifflin, connected by the W.D. Mansfield Memorial Bridge. Port Vue, the Borough of Liberty and Elizabeth Township are located across the Youghiogheny River to the west, connected by the 15th Street Bridge.

Demographics

The population has fallen to little more than a third of its wartime high, with the 2010 census recording fewer than twenty thousand residents in contrast to the fifty-five thousand of 1940.

As of the census of 2000, there were 24,040 people, 9,655 households, and 5,976 families residing in the city. The population density was 4,806.9 people per square mile (1,856.4/km2). There were 11,124 housing units at an average density of 2,224.3 per square mile (859.0/km2). The racial makeup of the city was 72.40% White, 24.46% African American, 0.27% Native American, 0.12% Asian, 0.01% Pacific Islander, 0.59% from other races, and 2.14% from two or more races. Hispanic or Latino of any race were 1.50% of the population.

There were 9,655 households, out of which 28.6% had children under the age of 18 living with them, 34.7% were married couples living together, 21.9% had a female householder with no husband present, and 38.1% were non-families. 33.9% of all households were made up of individuals, and 15.7% had someone living alone who was 65 years of age or older. The average household size was 2.35 and the average family size was 3.01.

In the city, the population was spread out, with 25.4% under 18, 7.5% from 18 to 24, 24.8% from 25 to 44, 21.3% from 45 to 64, and 20.9% who were 65 years of age or older. The median age was 40. For every 100 females, there were 84.8 males; for every 100 females age 18 and over, there were 76.8 males.

The median income for a household in the city was $23,715, and the median income for a family was $31,577. Males had a median income of $27,412 versus $21,977 for females. The per capita income for the city was $13,242. About 18.1% of families and 23.0% of the population were below the poverty line, including 35.9% of those under age 18 and 12.1% of those age 65 or over.

Culture
McKeesport's population is a diverse mix of races and nationalities.  As a celebration of these heritages, McKeesport hosts an annual ethnic food festival and community celebration referred to as International Village.  Started in 1960, the three-day festival is one of the Pittsburgh-area's largest and oldest ethnic festivals and features traditional cuisines from Africa, China, Croatia, England, France, Germany, Greece, Hawaii, Hungary, Ireland, Italy, Lebanon, the Mediterranean, Mexico, Poland, Serbia, Slovakia, Slovenia, Sweden, and Vietnam.

Landmarks

 Renziehausen Park Rose Garden and Arboretum
 Penn State University - Greater Allegheny Campus
 McKeesport Area High School
 Great Allegheny Passage Trail
 Steel Valley Trail
 Youghiogheny River Trail
 St Mary's German Church
 First Methodist Episcopal Church of McKeesport
 Carnegie Free Library
 Jerome Street Bridge
 McKeesport Marina
 McKeesport National Bank
 Dead Man's Hollow

Law, government and politics

Government
McKeesport operates under a home rule charter based on a “Strong Mayor”/Council form of government, adopted in 1974.

Under the Home Rule Charter, the Mayor is elected at large and cannot be a member of the City Council. The Mayor serves as the leader of the City government, and is vested exclusive executive and administrative authority. Under the Home Rule Charter, the Mayor may appoint a Deputy Mayor from among the department executives.

The current Mayor of McKeesport is Democrat Michael Cherepko, a former City Councilman and McKeesport Area School District teacher, He was elected in 2011, defeating Independent candidate Raymond Malinchak and was re-elected for a second and third term, commencing in January 2016 and January 2020 respectively. Mayors assume office in the January following election.

Mayor's Committees were first developed in their current form by Michael Cherepko and serve as advisory bodies with no formal powers. The Select Committee on Crime and Violence was formed in 2012, responsible for addressing the problems of crime and violence by utilizing resources and seeking funding for youth and adult initiatives. The McKeesport Message Committee was subsequently developed as a subgroup to promote the city's message of "Respect, Dignity, Hope, and Love" which encourages residents' pride in the city. This subgroup promotes this through community and school engagement and creative marketing. The Mayor's Committee on Community Issues was formed in 2014, responsible for providing dialogue between McKeesport residents, the Mayor's Office and other city departments.

The McKeesport City Council consists of seven individuals elected “at large” for staggered four‐ year terms. A President and Vice President is elected among themselves. The Council acts as the legislative body and is responsible for establishing policy through the adoption of ordinances, resolutions, or motions.  Most government action and legislative authority in City government rests with the City Council, as well as the confirmation of certain appointments by the Mayor.

Law enforcement

The McKeesport Police Department is one of the largest municipal law enforcement agencies in the region, presently employing 52 sworn officers, and is one of the few departments in Allegheny County with its own detective bureau and traffic division. It operates closely with the Allegheny County Police Department, which provides investigative and forensic services for serious crimes such as homicide and the Allegheny County Sheriff's Office, which provides transport and detention services. Other agencies also provide law enforcement within the city due to overlapping jurisdictions, such as the Port Authority Police Department, McKeesport Area School District, and Penn State Greater Allegheny Police & Public Safety.

Infrastructure

Transportation

Pennsylvania Route 148 runs through downtown Mckeesport, ending in south McKeesport at the junction of Route 48. The Yellow Belt follows Route 148 from the east, to the Jerome Street Bridge.  Route 148 Truck runs exclusively within McKeesport, following Market Street three blocks to the west of the narrower mainline Route 148. McKeesport is also connected to Route 837 by the McKeesport-Duquesne Bridge, the terminus of the Green Belt, providing a direct link to Pittsburgh.

McKeesport is the beginning of the CSX Pittsburgh Subdivision, where it meets the Mon Subdivision. It is also served by the Transtar Union Railroad, which absorbed the McKeesport Connecting Railroad in 2013.

Amtrak also provided intercity rail service via the Capitol Limited between Chicago and Washington D.C. from 1982 to 1990. The city was formerly served by the PATrain commuter service, known as the "McKeesporter", until 1989.

The city is served by the Pittsburgh Regional Transit intracity and intercity bus network, and Heritage Community Transportation. The McKeesport Transportation Center serves as the primary transit hub of the city, and underwent a $1 million redevelopment in 2017.

Health care
Founded in 1894, UPMC McKeesport offers 216 beds for acute care patients and 56 beds for patients who need skilled nursing care.  Located at 1500 Fifth Ave, the hospital joined the UPMC network in April 1998.  In addition to an Intensive Care Unit and Cardiac Care Unit, the hospital offers ongoing rehabilitation and educational programs to patients with cardiac, neurologic, and orthopaedic diagnoses. A new, state-of-the-art emergency room opened in December 1999.

Notable people

Academia 
George Marcus, anthropologist
Sherman Mellinkoff, second dean of the School of Medicine at the University of California, Los Angeles
Merrill Singer, anthropologist
Herbert Spiegel, psychiatrist, "father of hypnosis"

Actors and broadcasters 
Grover Dale, actor, dancer, choreographer, director
Aline MacMahon, Oscar-nominated actress
Tamara Tunie, actress, singer
Richard Wilson, screenwriter and director

Business and industry 
Raymond J. Lane, managing partner of GreatPoint Ventures, former partner at Kleiner Perkins, former president and chief operating officer of Oracle Corporation
Helen Richey, first woman pilot of a commercial airliner
Robert J. Stevens, chairman, president, and chief executive officer of Lockheed Martin

Military
Donald M. Carpenter, aviator in the U.S. Navy
Franklin J. Phillips, also known as Harry Fisher, United States Marine and Medal of Honor recipient

Musicians and artists 
Sheila Butler, visual artist
Byron Janis, pianist
Henrietta Leaver, Miss America 1935
Duane Michals, photographer
Sam Sneed, music producer and rapper
Jerry Tachoir, jazz vibraphone and marimba player
Mort Weiss, jazz clarinet player

Sports

Auto racing
Tommy Gale, NASCAR Winston Cup driver in the 1970s and 1980s

Baseball 
Tim Conroy, former major league pitcher
Brian Holton, former MLB relief pitcher
Rick Krivda, MLB pitcher and 2000 Olympic gold medalist
Tom Qualters, former MLB pitcher
Bill Robinson, former MLB outfielder and coach
Gary Ross, former MLB pitcher

Basketball 
Swin Cash, WNBA player, 2000 and 2012 Olympic Gold Medalist

Bullfighting 
Bette Ford, first American bullfighter to fight in the Plaza Mexico

Football 
Jim Beirne, former AFL/NFL wide receiver, Houston Oilers (1968–1973, 1976), San Diego Chargers (1974–1975)
Ron Crosby, NFL and USFL player
Dave Gasser, former Canadian Football League linebacker for the Edmonton Eskimos (1967–1972)
Khaleke Hudson, NFL Linebacker, Washington Commanders (2020– )
Branden Jackson, NFL Defensive End, Oakland Raiders (2016), Seattle Seahawks (2017– )The Raging Bull. Toms River North Mariners. 1990–1992
Jim Kelly, former Notre Dame and NFL tight end
Maurice Leggett, former Kansas City Chiefs cornerback
Mike Logan, former Pittsburgh Steelers safety
Bob Long, former NFL wide receiver, Green Bay Packers (1964–1967), Atlanta Falcons (1968), Washington Redskins (1969), Los Angeles Rams (1970)
Bill Miller, former AFL wide receiver, Dallas Texans (1962), Buffalo Bills (1963), Oakland Raiders (1964–1968); two TD catches in Super Bowl II
George Mrkonic, football player for the University of Kansas
Greg Paterra, NFL player
Brandon Short, former NFL linebacker, New York Giants (2000–2003, 2006), Carolina Panthers (2004–2005)
Jim Trimble, former NFL and CFL head football coach

Politicians and governmental leaders 
Queen Alliquippa, leader of the Seneca tribe of American Indians during the early part of the 18th century
Frank Buchanan, former mayor of McKeesport and member of the United States House of Representatives, husband of Vera Buchanan
Vera Buchanan, former member of the United States House of Representatives, wife of Frank Buchanan
William Henry Coleman, former member of the United States House of Representatives
Marc Gergely, Pennsylvania state representative
John E. McLaughlin, former Deputy Director of Central Intelligence
Emil Mrkonic, former Democratic member of the Pennsylvania House of Representatives
Bill Shuster, member of the United States House of Representatives
 Al Benedict, Pennsylvania Auditor General from 1977 to 1985
 Nicholas P. Papadakos, Justice, Pennsylvania Supreme Court from 1984 to 1995.
 Austin Davis, Pennsylvania Lieutenant Governor-elect (2023 to 2027)

Writers 
Bob Carroll, Jr., television screenwriter noted for his work on I Love Lucy
Marc Connelly, playwright
John Hoerr, journalist and author of And the Wolf Finally Came: The Decline of the American Steel Industry
David Kalstone, writer and literary critic
Robert M. McBride, writer and publisher

In popular culture 
McKeesport appears briefly in the Marvel comic Dark Reign: Zodiac#1.

The 2009 novel Monongahela Dusk, by John Hoerr, is set in 1940s McKeesport.

The Netflix series Mindhunter used downtown McKeesport as 1977 Sacramento, California.

In season four of the Classic Cartoon Rocky & Bullwinkle, McKeesport is featured in two episodes "Goof Gas Attack" & "McKeesport on the Prod or The Pennsylvania Poker".

In the film Tommy Boy, Chris Farley remarks "I don't see any McKeesport" when looking for the city on a road map.

See also
 List of cities in Pennsylvania

References

External links

 City of McKeesport official website

 
Cities in Pennsylvania
Populated places established in 1795
Pittsburgh metropolitan area
Cities in Allegheny County, Pennsylvania
Pennsylvania populated places on the Monongahela River
1795 establishments in Pennsylvania